Bellwood School District may refer to: 
 Bellwood-Antis School District in Pennsylvania
 Bellwood School District 88 in Illinois